Alcon is a Swiss-American pharmaceutical and medical device company specializing in eye care products. It is headquartered in Geneva, Switzerland and has a major presence in Fort Worth, Texas, United States, where it employs about 4,500 people. 

Alcon was a subsidiary of Novartis until April 2019, when it was spun out into a separate publicly-traded company. Alcon itself has a number of subsidiaries including Aerie Pharmaceuticals, focused on therapies for glaucoma and other diseases of the eye, and WaveLight, which develops and manufactures laser eye surgery technologies.

History 
Alcon was founded in 1945 as a small pharmcy in Fort Worth, Texas, United States. It was named for its founders, pharmacists Robert Alexander and William Conner. Conner and Alexander focused on sterile ophthalmic products. 

Nestlé of Switzerland purchased Alcon in 1977. Alcon expanded its manufacturing capability with new plants in South America and Europe and drastically increased its investment in research.

In 1979, Alcon acquired Texas Pharmacal Company which became Dermatological Products of Texas (and is now DPT Laboratories).

In 1984, Alcon founded the Technical Excellence Award to promote achievements in R&D excellence and has awarded it to more than 100 recipients. The Alcon product line has expanded from pharmaceuticals to the surgical arena. Today, Alcon has operations in 75 countries and its products are sold in over 180 countries.

Nestlé conducted an initial public offering of 25% of its stake in Alcon in 2002. The stock is traded under the ticker symbol ALC. In July 2008, Novartis purchased approximately 25% of Nestlé's stake in Alcon, with an option to buy Nestlé's remaining shares beginning in 2010. Novartis bought 52% stake from Nestlé for $28.1 Billion. This deal brought the total ownership of Alcon by Novartis to 77%. Beginning January 2010 Novartis formally announced it will be completing the exercise options for finishing purchasing the rest of Alcon and then promptly continue to exercise merger and takeover of Alcon.

On March 29, 2010, Alcon acquired Durezol and Zyclorin from Sirion Therapeutics. Alcon received regulatory approval to acquire the rights of Durezol emulsion in the US and the global rights, excluding Latin America, for Zyclorin from Sirion Therapeutics.

On June 28, 2010, Alcon's Independent Director Committee announced that a recommendation by the committee was an indispensable first step before the board of the company can decide on the merger proposal of Novartis AG, refuted Novartis’ public implications that it would be able to unilaterally impose the merger irrespective of the Independent Director Committee's position once Novartis became Alcon's majority shareholder. On July 8, 2010, Alcon's independent director committee (IDC) had set up a $50 million litigation trust to ensure company's minority shareholders get the best deal from bidder Novartis AG.

On April 9, 2019, Alcon completed a 100% spin-off from Novartis. The new standalone company is worth up to 28 billion Swiss francs.

In November 2021, Alcon announced it would acquire Ivantis and their glaucoma surgery stent technology for at least $475 million. In August 2022, Alcon agreed to buy Aerie Pharmaceuticals for US$770million to enhance its ophthalmic pharmaceutical portfolio.

References

External links

 
Alcon Official Website
Alcon : Novartis exercises option and proposes merger
Novartis needs Alcon directors' OK for buyout
Swiss Corporate Governance Expert Supports Alcon Independent Director Committee’s Position against Novartis 

 
Pharmaceutical companies established in 1945
Companies based in Fort Worth, Texas
Pharmaceutical companies of Switzerland
Multinational companies
Contact lenses
Pharmaceutical companies of the United States
Companies listed on the New York Stock Exchange
Companies listed on the SIX Swiss Exchange
Life sciences industry
Health care companies based in Texas
Eyewear companies of the United States
Novartis
2010 mergers and acquisitions
2002 initial public offerings